Josh Epstein is a Canadian actor, producer and writer. He produced, co-wrote and acted in Public Schooled starring Judy Greer, Russell Peters, Grace Park and Daniel Doheny which premiered at the Toronto International Film Festival in 2017.  He received a Canadian Screen Award nomination for Best Adapted Screenplay at the 4th Canadian Screen Awards in 2016, as cowriter with Kyle Rideout of the film Eadweard; he also had a supporting role in the film as Thomas Edison.

As a stage actor in Canada, his roles have included Michael Darling in a 1988 production of Peter Pan, Charlie in Marvin's Room, Speed in Two Gentlemen of Verona, Joey in Pal Joey, LeFou in Beauty and the Beast, Leo Bloom in The Producers, one of the gangster pastry chefs in The Drowsy Chaperone, Barfee in The 25th Annual Putnam County Spelling Bee, Freddy Benson in Dirty Rotten Scoundrels, Barnaby in The Matchmaker, Berowne in Love's Labour's Lost, and Lensky in Onegin. He won Jessie Theatre Richardson Awards for his acting as Barfee and Lensky.

He has also appeared in guest roles on the television series The X-Files, Breaker High, So Weird and Package Deal, and as a chorus dancer in the 2007 film Hairspray.

He has also written two one-man plays, Walking Away and Wow, I Didn't Know She Was Jewish.

References

External links

20th-century Canadian male actors
21st-century Canadian male actors
Canadian male screenwriters
21st-century Canadian dramatists and playwrights
Canadian male stage actors
Canadian male television actors
Canadian male musical theatre actors
Canadian male film actors
Canadian male dramatists and playwrights
Film producers from British Columbia
Jewish Canadian male actors
Jewish Canadian writers
Male actors from Vancouver
Writers from Vancouver
Living people
21st-century Canadian male writers
Canadian Film Centre alumni
Year of birth missing (living people)
21st-century Canadian screenwriters
Jewish Canadian filmmakers